SC (formerly Supercomputing), the International Conference for High Performance Computing, Networking, Storage and Analysis, is the annual conference established in 1988 by the Association for Computing Machinery and the IEEE Computer Society. In 2019, about 13,950 people participated overall; by 2022 attendance had rebounded to 11,830 both in-person and online. The not-for-profit conference is run by a committee of approximately 600 volunteers who spend roughly three years organizing each conference.

Sponsorship and Governance
SC is sponsored by the Association for Computing Machinery and the IEEE Computer Society. From its formation through 2011, ACM sponsorship was managed through ACM's Special Interest Group on Computer Architecture (SIGARCH). Sponsors are listed on each proceedings page in the ACM DL; see for example. Beginning in 2012, ACM began the process of transitioning sponsorship from SIGARCH to the recently formed Special Interest Group on High Performance Computing (SIGHPC). This transition was completed after SC15, and for SC16 ACM sponsorship was vested exclusively in SIGHPC (IEEE sponsorship remained unchanged). The conference is non-profit.

The conference is governed by a steering committee that includes representatives of the sponsoring societies, the current conference general chair, the general chairs of the preceding two years, the general chairs of the next two conference years, and a number of elected members. All steering committee members are volunteers, with the exception of the two representatives of the sponsoring societies, who are employees of those societies. The committee selects the conference general chair, approves each year's conference budget, and is responsible for setting policy and strategy for the conference.

Conference Components
Although each conference committee introduces slight variations on the program each year, the core components of the conference remain largely unchanged from year to year.

Technical Program
The SC Technical Program is competitive with an acceptance rate around 20% for papers (see History). Traditionally, the program includes invited talks, panels, research papers, tutorials, workshops, posters, and Birds of a Feather (BoF) sessions.

Awards
Each year, SC hosts the following conference and sponsoring society awards:

ACM Gordon Bell Prize
ACM/IEEE-CS George Michael Memorial HPC Fellowship
ACM/IEEE-CS Ken Kennedy Award
ACM SIGHPC Computational & Data Science Fellowships
ACM SIGHPC Outstanding Doctoral Dissertation Award
ACM SIGHPC Emerging Woman Leader in Technical Computing Award
IEEE-CS Seymour Cray Computer Engineering Award
IEEE-CS Sidney Fernbach Memorial Award
IEEE CS TCHPC Award for Excellence for Early Career Researchers in HPC
Test of Time Award

Exhibits
In addition to the technical program, SC hosts a research exhibition each year that includes universities, state-sponsored computing research organizations (such as the Federal labs in the US), and vendors of HPC-related hardware and software from many countries around the world. There were 353 exhibitors at SC16 in Salt Lake City, UT.

Student Program
SC's program for students has gone through a variety of changes and emphases over the years. Beginning with SC15 the program is called "Students@SC", and is oriented toward undergraduate and graduate students in computing related fields, and computing-oriented students in science and engineering. The program includes professional development programs, opportunities to learn from mentors, and engagement with SC's technical sessions.

SCinet
SCinet is SC's research network. Started in 1991, SCinet features emerging technologies for very high bandwidth, low latency wide area network communications in addition to operational services necessary to provide conference attendees with connectivity to the commodity Internet and to many national research and engineering networks.

Name changes
Since its establishment in 1988, and until 1995,
the full name of the conference was the "ACM/IEEE Supercomputing Conference" (sometimes: "ACM/IEEE Conference on Supercomputing"). The conference's abbreviated (and more commonly used) formal name was "Supercomputing 'XY", where XY denotes the last two digits of the year. In 1996, according to the archived  front matter of the conference proceedings,
the full name was changed to the ACM/IEEE "International Conference on
High Performance Computing and Communications". The latter document
further announced that, as of 1997, the conference will undergo a name
change and will be called "SC97: High Performance Networking and
Computing". The document explained that

A 1997 HPC Wire article discussed at length the reasoning,
considerations, and concerns that accompanied the decision to change
the name of the conference series from "Supercomputing 'XY" to "SC
'XY",
stating that

Despite these concerns, the abbreviated name of the conference, "SC",
is still used today, a reminiscent of the abbreviation of the 
conference's original name—"Supercomputing Conference".

The full name, in contrast, underwent several changes.
Between 1997 and 2003,
the name "High Performance Networking and Computing" was specified in
the front matter of the archived conference proceedings in some years
(1997, 1998, 2000, 2002), whereas in other years it was omitted
altogether in favor of the abbreviated name (1999, 2001, 2003).
In 2004,
the stated front matter full name was changed to "High Performance
Computing, Networking and Storage Conference".
In 2005,
this name was replaced by the original name of the conference—"supercomputing"—
in the front matter. 
Finally, in 2006,
the current full name, as used today, emerged: "The International Conference for High Performance Computing, Networking, Storage and Analysis".

Despite all of the name variances in the proceedings through the years, the digital library of ACM, the co-sponsoring society, records the name of the conference as "The ACM/IEEE Conference on Supercomputing" from 1998 - 2008, when it changes to ""The International Conference for High Performance Computing, Networking, Storage and Analysis". It is these two names that are used in the full citations to the conference proceedings provided in this article.

History
The table below provides the location, name of the general chair, and acceptance statistics for each year of SC. Note that references for data in these tables apply to data preceding the reference to the left on the same row; for example, for SC17 the single reference substantiates all the information in that row, but for SC05 the source for the convention center and chair is different than the source for the acceptance statistics.

Originally slated to be held in Atlanta, GA, SC20 was converted to a fully virtual conference due to the COVID-19 pandemic; the conference agenda spread across two weeks instead of the typical one week for an in-person conference. Over 7,440 attendees participated from 115 countries.  SC21 was held as a hybrid conference with both in-person attendance in St. Louis, MO, and virtual attendance options available.

Keynote speakers
The following table details the keynote speakers during the history of the conference; as of SC20, 18.2% of the keynote speakers have been female, with a mix of speakers from corporate, academic, and national government organizations.

See also
 Gordon Bell Prize
 Sidney Fernbach Award
 Seymour Cray Award
 Ken Kennedy Award
 TOP500
 Green500
 HPC Challenge Awards
 SCinet

References

External links 
 The SC Conference Website
 SC Conference Series on YouTube

Computer science conferences
Computer conferences
Recurring events established in 1988
1988 establishments in Florida
Annual events in the United States
IEEE conferences
Association for Computing Machinery conferences
Supercomputing